Squares have long been a feature of London and come in numerous identifiable forms. The landscaping spectrum of squares stretches from those with more hardscape, constituting town squares (also known as city squares)—to those with communal gardens, for which London is a major international exponent, known as garden squares.

A few in the capital of the United Kingdom, such as Trafalgar Square, began as public open spaces in the same way as other city squares worldwide, typically a plaza, piazza and a platz in Spain, Italy and Germany. Most, however, began as garden squares i.e. private communal gardens for the inhabitants of surrounding houses. All types of the space are more prevalent in parts of London with high (urban) density. Some of these gardens are now open to the public, while others, for example around Notting Hill, are railed (a form of fencing) and private.

The terminology has been loosely applied for over a century.  Some "squares" are irregularly shaped—including five triangles, a pentagon, hexagon, octagon, and two ovals among those officially named Square. Approbative and technical studies of garden squares commonly cover equivalent landscaped communal gardens not named as a Square many of which have become small public parks. A diversity of descriptive names features in the list of London's "garden squares".

Name and shape
"Square" is a generic term for neat, planned or set aside urban open spaces larger than a verge or pavement overlooked by buildings. In London, elements of fields were set aside, a fact reflected in the name of the square London Fields and two later examples: Coram's Fields and Lincoln's Inn Fields.  Some are not actually square, or even rectangular. One reason for this is the use of a local nickname for the street, park or garden in question. Another is that some older squares were irregularly shaped to begin with, or lost their original layout due to the city's many transformations, not least following the Great Fire of London and The Blitz.

The street naming (or streetnaming) authority of each London Borough and the City of London Corporation by authority of an Act of 1939 imposes rules to authorise appropriate street names for new developments and for owners wishing to rename features.  Commercial building and retained historic names apart, new residential squares must in many boroughs be "for a square only" — considered not well elongated but rectangular and to some extent open.  Billiter Square, EC3 and Millennium Square, SE1 in districts dominated by retail, commerce and offices are among many modern buildings (not beside a visible rectangular open space) that include alternative, higher built density, square features to their design—such as a courtyard or a square footprint.

Some squares such as Granary Square are paved; others like Russell Square have grass and trees; many others have diverse communal gardens. Most of those that are actually square have the word in their name, and these are listed below. Others more flexibly identified do not. Such notable lists are commonly identified as list of garden squares or estate gardens, communal gardens, formal gardens, about which many books have been written. Increasingly, spaces are being constructed that are legally private, though in practice open to the public (Paternoster Square).

The Royal Borough of Kensington and Chelsea contains over a hundred garden squares whose use is restricted to residents, almost all share a name with their directly adjoining road. Residents may contract with private contractors or with the council, in which case the council charges those residents, typically at the same time as council tax. One instance is a lens (pointed oval), The Boltons.

Toward the public end of the public/private continuum, London's growth has taken in village greens. A minority of these partly or wholly survive such as Newington Green to form council-run open spaces breaking up housing, road networks and/or retail streets. The categories of greens and garden squares become more well-visited where larger than an informal scale. These are mainly government-run, characteristic parks and open spaces in London. By subtle distinction their less urban equivalent amounts to London's 26 commons most of which were diminished in the period of legal inclosure and/or the city/county's 16 country parks.

History

Development of squares
The making of residential squares fell into decline in the early 20th century, one of the last notable such squares having been designed by Edwin Lutyens for Hampstead Garden Suburb. Numerous squares were in danger of filling in for further building. This was banned by the London Squares Act of 1931. In the last quarter of the 20th century a fashion for making office squares developed, a trend led by the Broadgate development. Developers such as London Square, Berkeley Homes and Taylor Wimpey (in the first two instances through their London subsidiaries) have built and set aside land in more than one of their 21st century London developments to create those of the residential type. More broadly, mixed-use squares to give a focal area have become a resurgent planning design, reflected for instance in Times Square, Sutton and Canada Square, Canary Wharf.

Viewings and events in private communal gardens

Since 1998 many private squares (which term in that context takes in many other shapes of gardens between houses) temporarily open to the paying public: London's "Open Garden Squares Weekend", founded by Caroline Aldiss, takes place on the second weekend in June. The event is organised by the London Parks and Garden Trust. In 2013 over 200 gardens took part, including the garden of the prime minister at 10 Downing Street and the Gardens of HM Prison Wormwood Scrubs. Other events in keynote squares coincide such as a World Archaeology Festival, Gordon Square, Bloomsbury run by UCL Institute of Archaeology.

The parks can be categorised as public garden squares, private garden squares or other squares.

Social importance

The local proliferation relative to other UK cities coupled with, since the early 20th century, their widespread opening up has similarly made squares broadly cited in portrayals of London.  Initially cultural use was mainly confined to novels and, to a lesser degree, fine art.

"It's a Long Way to Tipperary" is a 1910s song featuring the line "Farewell Leicester Square". "A Nightingale Sang in Berkeley Square" is a romantic hit of 1940 with lyrics by Eric Maschwitz and music by Manning Sherwin, sang that year separately by Ray Noble and Vera Lynn and a theme of a film the next year, by Fritz Lang., Man Hunt.  In the 1956 song "Why Can't The English?" from the musical My Fair Lady, Professor Henry Higgins laments, "Hear them down in Soho Square/Dropping H's everywhere."

Drama most notably includes the high-audience soap opera broadcast by the BBC running since 1985, EastEnders based on a semi-permanent set north of London's border, Albert Square. It had pre-release titles Square Dance, Round the Square, Round the Houses, London Pride and East 8.

Soho Square garden contains a bench that commemorates the singer Kirsty MacColl, who wrote the song "Soho Square" for her album Titanic Days. After her death in 2000, fans bought a memorial bench in her honour, inscribing the lyrics: "One day I'll be waiting there / No empty bench in Soho Square". The Lindisfarne album Elvis Lives On the Moon also includes a song named after that square.

Notable communal gardens surrounded by buildings

Arundel Gardens
Bedford Square
Belgrave Square
Berkeley Square
Clapton Square
Egerton Gardens
Finsbury Circus
Golden Square
Grosvenor Square
Hans Place
Harrington Gardens
Kensington Square
Kensington Park Gardens
Lennox Gardens, London
Park Crescent
Royal Crescent
Russell Square
St George's Square
St. James's Square
Sloane Square
Soho Square
The Boltons
Wilton Crescent

Most notable town squares
Trafalgar Square
Leicester Square
Parliament Square

List of Greater London squares
This list comprises places bearing the word Square. The tables state if each has an open-air space exceeding a double-size pavement or the provision of parking spaces. Those marked mainly (due to a building, typically a church, school or community hall in the space) or yes have a clear, open space. Those marked No include streets of any shape including those with vestigial names (throwbacks) to open spaces that lay there (or adjacent) before.

Demolished squares are listed in a table at the end of this section.

Approximate area, in square metres, includes hardscapes and roads.

London's squares are arranged by postcode, see the map below of postcodes.

Centremost postcodes

Inner

North and northwest

West and southwest

South

East

Renamed squares note:
Albert Gardens
Trafalgar Gardens
These two 19th century built Squares are officially renamed as shown. This avoids confusion with other squares in London.

Outer

East

West
(the London Boroughs of Hillingdon, Hounslow and Ealing, exc. Harefield, Isleworth and Feltham)

South West
Royal/London Boroughs of Kingston-upon-Thames, Richmond upon Thames and Wandsworth, excluding Battersea, Norwood, Clapham and Balham.

South East
Royal/London Boroughs of Greenwich, Lewisham, Bexley and Bromley (plus Norwood and Dulwich)

North

South

North west

Demolished
Angel Square, EC1
Billiter Square, EC3
Holford Square
Harewood Square
Pancras Square

See also
 List of garden squares in London
 Parks and open spaces in London

Notes and references
Notes

References

External links

 London squares 
 London Parks and Gardens Trust
 London Squares by 1799

 
Squares, London